The King's English is a book on English usage and grammar. It was written by the brothers Henry Watson Fowler and Francis George Fowler and published in 1906; it thus predates by twenty years Modern English Usage, which was written by Henry alone after Francis's death in 1918.

The King's English is less like a dictionary than Modern English Usage; it consists of longer articles on more general topics, such as vocabulary, syntax, and punctuation and draws heavily on examples from many sources throughout. One of its sections is a systematic description of the appropriate uses of shall and will. The third and last edition was published in 1931, by which time Modern English Usage had superseded it in popularity.

Because all living languages continually evolve, the book is now considered outdated in some respects, and some of the Fowlers' opinions about correct English usage are at times seen as antiquated (yet not incorrect) with regard to contemporary standards. For example, the Fowlers disapprove of the word "concision" on the grounds that it had a technical meaning in theology, "to which it may well be left"; but "concision" is now a common synonym for "conciseness". The Fowlers also criticised the use of standpoint and just how much (as in "Just how much more of this can we take?"), describing them as undesirable "Americanisms", but both are now common in British English. The book nevertheless remains a benchmark for usage and is still in print.

See also
Hart's Rules
 Received Pronunciation

Notes

References
Henry Fowler, Frank Fowler, Matthew Parris (Introduction). The King's English (Oxford Language Classics Series). Oxford University Press. .

External links
The full text of the second, 1908, edition is available online at: http://www.bartleby.com/116/

Style guides for British English
1906 non-fiction books